Manteno Township is one of seventeen townships in Kankakee County, Illinois, USA.  As of the 2010 census, its population was 11,185 and it contained 4,525 housing units. It was formed from Rockville Township on March 12, 1855.

Geography

Cities, towns, villages
 Bourbonnais (north quarter)
 Bradley (north edge)
 Manteno

Adjacent townships
 Peotone Township, Will County (north)
 Will Township, Will County (northeast)
 Sumner Township (east)
 Ganeer Township (southeast)
 Bourbonnais Township (south)
 Rockville Township (west)

Cemeteries
The township contains these three cemeteries: Elmwood, Saint Joseph and State Hospital.

Major highways
  Interstate 57
  U.S. Route 45
  Illinois Route 50

Airports and landing strips
 Phipps Airport
 Spangler Airport

Landmarks
 Heritage Park

Demographics

Government
The township is governed by an elected Town Board of a Supervisor and four Trustees.  The Township also has an elected Assessor, Clerk, Highway Commissioner and Supervisor.  The Township Office is located at 452 Water Tower South, Manteno, IL 60950.

Political districts
 Illinois's 2nd congressional district
 State House District 34
 State Senate District 17

School districts
 Manteno Community Unit School District 5

References
 
 United States Census Bureau 2007 TIGER/Line Shapefiles
 United States National Atlas

External links
 Kankakee County Official Site
 City-Data.com
 Illinois State Archives

Townships in Kankakee County, Illinois
1855 establishments in Illinois
Townships in Illinois